The 2002 Kyoto gubernatorial election was held on 13 March 2002 to elect the next governor of , a prefecture of Japan located in the Kansai region of Honshu island.

Candidates 

Teiichi Aramaki, 71, incumbent since 1986, not seeking re-election. He supported Keiji Yamada.
Keiji Yamada, 48, former Home Affairs Ministry bureaucrat, former vice governor of the prefecture. He was supported by the LDP, New Komeito party and the NCP, as well as the opposition DPJ, the LP and the SDP.
Akira Morikawa, 53, lawyer, endorsed by JCP.
Yasuhiro Nakagawa, 50, former mayor of the town of Yagi for the (LDP).
Yutaka Imada, 36, former company employee.

Results

References 

2002 elections in Japan
Kyoto gubernational elections
Politics of Kyoto Prefecture
April 2002 events in Japan